Sir Henry Seton-Karr  (5 February 1853 – 29 May 1914) was an English explorer, hunter and author and a Conservative politician who sat in the House of Commons from 1885 to 1906.

Seton-Karr, born in India in 1853, was the son of George Berkeley Seton-Karr, of the Indian Civil Service (resident Commissioner at Baroda during the Indian Mutiny); and his wife Eleanor, the daughter of Henry Usborne of Branches Park, Suffolk. He was educated at Harrow School and Corpus Christi College, University of Oxford gaining an MA in law in 1876. He was called to the bar at Lincoln's Inn in 1879. Seton-Karr owned a cattle ranch (Pick Ranch) in Wyoming, USA and was a director of Capitol Freehold Land and Investment Co. He was an explorer, big game hunter and writer.

Seton-Karr was elected as the Member of Parliament (MP) for St Helens in the 1885 general election and held the seat until his defeat at the 1906 general election. He did not stand again in St Helens, but at the January 1910 general election he stood unsuccessfully in Berwickshire.

He became a Deputy Lieutenant of Roxburghshire in 1896, and was made a Companion of the Order of St Michael and St George (CMG) in October 1902. A month later, he was among the new knight bachelors in the King′s 1902 Birthday Honours list, and he was formally knighted on 18 December 1902. 

He was also Chairman of the Liverpool, St Helens and South Lancashire Railway at the time of its opening in 1900 and Chairman of the Lancashire and Cheshire Workingmen's Federation in the late 1890s.

On 11 November 1880 Seton-Karr married Edith Eliza Pilkington (1860-1886), daughter of William Roby Pilkington and Elizabeth Lee Watson of Roby Hall, Liverpool. They had three children: George Bernard (born 12 September 1881), Malcolm Henry (born 21 October 1882) and Edith Muriel (born 1884). Both George and Edith Muriel died in their teens. After the death of his wife in 1884, he remarried in 1886 to Jane Jarvie Thorburn (1862-1953). They had two children: Helen Mary (born 6 October 1888) and Kenneth William (born 21 March 1897).

At Grange Park Golf Club, St Helens an annual competition is still played in the name of Seton-Karr. This is the most prestigious competition in the clubs calendar.

Seton-Karr died in Canada's greatest peacetime maritime disaster when the Empress of Ireland sank in the St. Lawrence River when he was returning to England from a hunting trip in British Columbia. He was interred at the Mount Hermon Cemetery, Sillery.

Publications
 Shores and Alps of Alaska (1887)
 Ten Years' Wild Sports in Foreign Lands; Or, Travels in the Eighties (1889)
A Handy Guide-Book to the Japanese Islands
Bear-hunting in the White Mountains; or, Alaska and British Columbia revisted (1891)
"How I Shot My Lions" in Everybody's Magazine (January 1900)
My Sporting Holidays (1904)
 Chapter in Early American Big Game Hunting (1905)

References

External links 

1853 births
1914 deaths
People educated at Harrow School
Conservative Party (UK) MPs for English constituencies
Knights Bachelor
UK MPs 1885–1886
UK MPs 1886–1892
UK MPs 1892–1895
UK MPs 1895–1900
UK MPs 1900–1906
Deaths due to shipwreck
Companions of the Order of St Michael and St George
Deputy Lieutenants of Roxburghshire
Alumni of Corpus Christi College, Oxford
Members of Lincoln's Inn
Accidental deaths in Quebec
Burials at Mount Hermon Cemetery